The New-Style Super NES (also known by its model number SNS-101) is a compact redesign of the original Super Nintendo Entertainment System home video game console released by Nintendo in 1997. In Japan, the system is called the  Like the redesigned version of the original Nintendo Entertainment System before it, the new-style Super NES was released late during the platform's lifespan.

Background

The New-Style Super NES was designed by Lance Barr, who previously designed the North American versions of the NES, and Super NES, as well as the redesigned NES. Released at a lower price point, Nintendo marketed it as an entry-level gamer's system for customers who were on a budget and who may have been put off by the higher price of other more modern systems such as the Nintendo 64, Sega Saturn and PlayStation. Nintendo marketed the system in North America simply as the "Super Nintendo Entertainment System", just as the company had done the original SNS-001 model. It was released in North America on October 20, 1997 and retailed for US$99.95. The system was available as a stand-alone package or in a variety of bundles, each including one pack-in game such as:
Super Mario World 2: Yoshi's Island
The Legend of Zelda: A Link to the Past (Target exclusive)
Kirby Super Star (Target exclusive)
Tetris Attack (Toys "R" Us exclusive)
The system was released in Japan as the Super Famicom Jr. on March 27, 1998, and retailed for ¥7,800. It was given the model number SHVC-101 and is very similar to the New-Style Super NES in both appearance and functionality. It was manufactured until September 2003.

Hardware changes 

The design of the SNS-101 is a large departure from that of the North American version of the original Super NES. The system features a smaller footprint than the older model and contains a much less angular design language. To reach an affordable price point, several features were removed. The system lacks the expansion slot on the bottom of the console featured on the SNS-001, making it incompatible with the Japan-exclusive Satellaview add-on. The power and reset buttons were moved to the left hand side, and the cartridge eject button has been removed entirely. Additionally, it lacks a power LED to indicate when the unit is on. The internal RF modulator was also removed; however, an external RF modulator can be used.

The SNS-101 features the same AV multi-out port used on the original model. The SNS-101 seemingly only supports composite video through this port, in contrast to the SNS-001 model, which supports composite video, S-Video and RGB from the outset. In reality the video encoder used within the system still supports S-Video and RGB, the pins were simply left unused, and as a result these removed functionalities can still be restored through internal hardware modifications. The overall video quality is said to be an improvement over earlier revisions of the Super NES console.

The included controller underwent slight changes and was given a new model number (SNS-102). The "Super Nintendo Entertainment System" marking on the front was replaced by a general Nintendo logo molded into the casing, and the sticker on the back of the controller bears both the Super NES and Super Famicom logos. The same controller model was used in both the North American and Japanese versions of the console, although the colors and shape of the ABXY buttons differ between regions as they did for the original SNS-005 and SHVC-005 controllers.

See also
New-Style NES
Wii Mini
Nintendo Switch Lite

Notes

References

External links

Super Nintendo Entertainment System
Fourth-generation video game consoles
65xx-based video game consoles

ja:スーパーファミコン#スーパーファミコンジュニア